Zhang Chenlong (born 27 April 1993) is a Chinese football player who currently plays for Hunan Billows in the China League Two.

Club career
Zhang Chenlong started his professional football career in 2011 when he was promoted to Dongguan Nancheng's squad for the 2011 China League Two campaign. He received cardiac surgery during the 2011 season and returned to field in May 2012. On 12 May 2012, he made his senior debut in a victory against Sichuan FC, coming on as a substitute for Xiang Jiachi in the 75th minute. On 26 May 2012, he scored two goals in the first round of 2012 Chinese FA Cup, which ensured Dongguan Nancheng beat amateur team Zibo Sunday and advanced to second round. He played 13 league match in the 2012 season, all came from substitution and scored one goal. 

Zhang transferred to Chinese Super League side Guangzhou R&F in 2013. After playing in the reserve league for two years, he was promoted to Guangzhou R&F's first team squad by Cosmin Contra in 2015. On 6 May 2015, he made his debut for Guangzhou R&F in the last match of 2015 AFC Champions League group stage against Buriram United in a 5–0 away defeat. He made his first-tier league debut on 20 June 2015, playing the whole match in a 2–1 away defeat to Chongqing Lifan. Playing as a substitute for Jiang Zhipeng, Zhang didn't get too many chances for the first team. However, on 15 January 2018, Zhang earned a contract renewal after Jiang Zhipeng's departure for Hebei China Fortune, extending his contract with the club until the end of 2021. On 25 July 2018, he scored his first goal for the club from an extremely tight angle near the post line in a 3–2 home win over Jiangsu Suning in the second leg of 2018 Chinese FA Cup.

Career statistics 
.

References

External links
 

1993 births
Living people
Chinese footballers
Footballers from Wuhan
Guangzhou City F.C. players
Beijing Renhe F.C. players
Chinese Super League players
Association football defenders